The men's 4 × 100 metres relay at the 2022 World Athletics Championships was held at the Hayward Field in Eugene on 22 and 23 July 2022.

Records
Before the competition records were as follows:

Qualification standard
The standard to qualify automatically for entry was to finish in the first 10 at 2021 World Relays, completed by 6 2021-2022 top lists' teams.

Participating teams

  (1st)
  (2nd)
  (3rd)
  (4th)
  (5th)
  (6th)
  (7th)
  (9th)
  (10th)
 
 
 
 
 
 
 

South Africa, subsequently disqualified for doping after the 2021 World Relays, finally replaces qualified Ukraine (8th at World Relays) which had withdrawn, as per the 7th and last time of the South African U20 team in Nairobi.

2021 Top list
37.50		1		National Stadium, Tokyo (JPN)	6 AUG 2021	
37.70		2		National Stadium, Tokyo (JPN)	6 AUG 2021	
37.79		3		National Stadium, Tokyo (JPN)	6 AUG 2021	
37.82		1h1		National Stadium, Tokyo (JPN)	5 AUG 2021	
38.06		4h2		National Stadium, Tokyo (JPN)	5 AUG 2021	
38.08		5h2		National Stadium, Tokyo (JPN)	5 AUG 2021	
38.10	 6h2		National Stadium, Tokyo (JPN)	5 AUG 2021
38.16		2h1		National Stadium, Tokyo (JPN)	5 AUG 2021	
38.16		7h2		National Stadium, Tokyo (JPN)	5 AUG 2021	
38.18		3h1		National Stadium, Tokyo (JPN)	5 AUG 2021	
38.27		1	International Stadium, Gateshead (GBR)	13 JUL 2021	
38.34		4h1		National Stadium, Tokyo (JPN)	5 AUG 2021	
38.49	 	3	International Stadium, Gateshead (GBR)	13 JUL 2021	
38.51	 U20	1	Moi International Sports Centre, Kasarani, Nairobi (KEN)	22 AUG 2021	
38.53		1		Yabatech Sport Complex, Lagos (NGR)	27 JUN 2021
38.63		5h1		National Stadium, Tokyo (JPN)	5 AUG 2021

2022 Top list

37.99		1f1	NR	Universitätsstadion am Biopark, Regensburg (GER) 3 June 2022
38.09	Adidas team	(USA) 	1f1	Percy Beard Track, Gainesville, FL (USA)	16 April 2022
38.31	 1		Alexander Stadium, Birmingham (GBR)	21 May 2022	
38.35	 1	Samuel Ogbemudia Stadium, Benin City (NGR)	25 June 2022
38.41		2		Alexander Stadium, Birmingham (GBR)	21 May 2022	
38.43		1	Mestský Stadion, Ostrava (CZE)	31 May 2022	
38.56	 	1	NR	Yecheon (KOR)	4 JUN 2022
38.63	 	1	National Stadium, Gaborone (BOT)	30 April 2022
38.70	 	1	Olympiastadion, Stockholm (SWE)	30 June 2022	
38.72		1f3		Hilmer Lodge Stadium, Walnut, CA (USA)	16 April 2022
38.76	 1		Hasely Crawford Stadium, Port-of-Spain (TTO)	26 June 2022
38.89	Racers Track Club (JAM) 	1f1		National Stadium, Kingston (JAM)	26 February 2022
38.89		2f1		Centre sportif du Bout-du-Monde, Geneva (SUI)	11 June 2022	
38.90	SESI - SP	(BRA)	1f3		Rio de Janeiro (BRA)	23 June 2022	
38.95		1		Stade Complexe Olympique, Oran (ALG)	1 July 2022	
38.97		1		Estadio Iberoamericano, Huelva (ESP)	25 May 2022	
38.98		2		Stade Complexe Olympique, Oran (ALG)	1 July 2022

Preview
Workd Athletics preview (men and women)

Team rosters
Each roster has 5 or 6 athletes:

Heat 1
 Germany:
 
 Lucas Ansah-Peprah
 Kevin Kranz
 Joshua Hartmann
 Milo Skupin-Alfa 
 Julian Wagner
 Nigeria:
 Favour Ashe
 Raymond Ekevwo
 Usheoritse Itsekiri 
 
 Seye Ogunlewe
 Udodi Onwuzurike
 Japan:
 
 
 Yuki Koike
 Abdul Hakim Sani Brown
  
 
 Great Britain:
 Harry Aikines-Aryeetey
 Zharnel Hughes
 Reece Prescod
 Jeremiah Azu
 Jona Efoloko
 Nethaneel Mitchell-Blake
 China:
 Su Bingtian
 Xie Zhenye
 Wu Zhiqiang
 Tang Xingqiang
 Chen Guanfeng 
 Deng Zhijiang
 the Netherlands:
 Joris van Gool
 Raphael Bouju
 Xavi Mo-Ajok
 Elvis Afrifa
 Hensley Paulina 
 Taymir Burnet
 United States:
 Trayvon Bromell
 Marvin Bracy
 Fred Kerley (r)
 Elijah Hall 
 Josephus Lyles
 Kyree King
 Ghana:
Benjamin Azamati
Sean Safo-Antwi
Joseph Oduro Manu
Joseph Amoah
Emmanuel Yeboah

Heat 2

 Denmark:
 Frederik Schou-Nielsen
 Tazana Kamanga-Dyrbak
 Kojo Musah
 Simon Hansen
 Tobias Larsen
 Emil Kjær
 South Africa:
 Akani Simbine
 Clarence Munyai
 Shaun Maswanganyi
 Gift Leotlela 
 Emile Erasmus
 Henricho Bruintjies
 Brazil: 
 Erik Cardoso
 Lucas Rodrigues da Silva
 Rodrigo do Nascimento
 Derick Silva 
 Gabriel dos Santos Garcia
 Felipe Bardi dos Santos
 Italy:
 Chituru Ali
 Marcell Jacobs (r)
 
 Fausto Desalu
 Lorenzo Patta
 Diego Pettorossi 
 Hillary Wanderson Polanco Rijo 
 France:
 Jimmy Vicaut
 Mouhamadou Fall (DQ)
 Pablo Matéo
 Aymeric Priam 
 Méba-Mickaël Zeze
 Ryan Zeze
 Spain:
 Alberto Calero
 Bernat Canet 
 
 
 Pablo Montalvo
 Pol Retamal
 Canada:
 Aaron Brown 
 Malachi Murray 
 Andre De Grasse
 Jerome Blake
 Brendon Rodney
 Benjamin Williams
 Jamaica:
 Kemar Bailey-Cole 
 Ackeem Blake
 Yohan Blake
 Oblique Seville
 Conroy Jones
 Jelani Walker

Schedule
The event schedule, in local time (UTC-7), was as follows:

Results

Heats 
The first three in each heat (Q) and the next two fastest (q) qualified for the final.

Final 
The final started on 23 July at 19:50.

References

4 x 100 metres relay
Relays at the World Athletics Championships